Alzina is the name of:

Given name 
Alzina Stevens (1849–1900), American labor leader, social reformer and editor
Alzina Toups, American chef

Surname 
Cécile Alzina (born 1981), French snowboarder
Ignatio Francisco Alzina
, Swiss artistic gymnast